Matthews, Wright & King was an American country music group formed in 1991. The band, Raymond Matthews (born October 13, 1956), Woody Wright (born October 10, 1957) and Tony King (born June 27, 1957), was put together by Columbia Records producer Larry Strickland after Shenandoah left the label, as an attempt to keep a viable country band on that label. Wright had previously been in another band called Memphis.

Though they enjoyed video success on CMT and TNN as well as touring with Reba McEntire for two seasons, their highest charting radio single, "The Power of Love," peaked at No. 41 on the Billboard Hot Country Singles & Tracks chart in 1992. It was the title track of their debut album, issued that same year on Columbia Records. The trio dissolved shortly after the release of their second album, Dream Seekers.

Since disbanding, Tony King joined Brooks & Dunn's backing band and was also briefly engaged to Wynonna Judd, Woody Wright found success as a gospel songwriter, producer and solo artist, while Raymond Matthews returned to his native Alabama and a successful contracting business.

In 2013, Raymond Matthews and his daughter, Ashley Matthews Mobley, released an album entitled Come Home.  The album is a compilation of gospel songs written by Raymond. Production and recording took place at Dugger Mountain Music Hall near Heflin, Alabama.

Discography

Power of Love

Musicians

Raymond Matthews – Vocals
Woody Wright – Vocals
Tony King – Vocals
Eddie Bayers – Drums
Willie Weeks – Bass
Tom Robb – Bass
Steve Gibson – Guitar
Bill Watson – Bass
Mark Casstevens – Guitar

Production

Marshall Morgan – Engineer
Toby Seay – Assistant Engineer
John Kunz – Assistant Engineer
Denny Purcell – Mastering
Carlos Grier – Editing
Bill Johnson – Art Direction
Rollow Welch – Design
Randee Saint Nicholas – Photography

Dream Seekers

Musicians

Eddie Bayers – Drums
Willie Weeks – Bass
Michael Rhodes – Bass
Brent Mason – Electric Guitars
Randy Scruggs – Electric Guitars
Don Potter - Acoustic Guitar
Paul Franklin - Steel Guitar
Matt Rollings - Piano, Synth
Steve Nathan - Organ, Synth
Ron Reynolds - Percussion

Production

Ron Reynolds – Engineer
Glenn Meadows – Digital Editing, Mastering
Bill Johnson – Art Direction
Rollow Welch – Design
Jodi Lynn Miller – Design Assistant
Peter Nash – Photography

Track information and credits verified from Discogs, AllMusic, and the album's liner notes.

Charts

Singles

Music videos

References

External links
[ Matthews, Wright & King] at Allmusic
Woody Wright Official

Country music groups from Tennessee
Columbia Records artists
Musical groups established in 1991
Musical groups disestablished in 1993
1991 establishments in Tennessee